Thomas Watkins McElhiney (January 22, 1919, West Union, West Virginia, United States – January 17, 1998, Baltimore) was an American diplomat and UNRWA's Commissioner-General from 1977 to 1979.

McElhiney grew up in West Virginia, New York City and the Mount Washington neighborhood of Baltimore. Educated at Johns Hopkins University for undergrad and studied after at Cornell University, McElhiney served in the Army Corps of Engineers in World War II. Joining the Foreign Service in 1946, he rose to be deputy chief of mission in the Sudan. He served as U.S. ambassador to Ghana from 1968 to 1971, and then as Inspector-General of the Foreign Service until retirement in 1974. He then joined the United Nations as deputy commissioner of UNRWA, rising to serve as commissioner from 1977 until his retirement in 1979.

McElhiney was the son of William James McElhiney and Elza Jones McElhiney. He married the former Helen Lawrence Lippincott, of Baltimore, Maryland, on September 7, 1946. The McElhineys had three children: Helen Townley McElhiney, Richard Lippincott McElhiney, and William Dashiell McElhiney.

McElhiney died January 17, 1998, aged 78, at the Johns Hopkins Hospital in Baltimore.

References

External links
McElhiney Family Genealogy

|-

1998 deaths
1919 births
Ambassadors of the United States to Ghana
Ambassadors of the United States to Ethiopia
American officials of the United Nations
Johns Hopkins University alumni
People from Baltimore
People from West Union, West Virginia
United States Foreign Service personnel
UNRWA officials
American expatriates in Sudan
United States Army personnel of World War II